The Squalo-class submarines were a group of four submarines built for the Royal Italian Navy (Regia Marina) during the 1930s. They were built at the Cantieri Riuniti dell'Adriatico (CRDA) shipyard at Monfalcone, and designed by Curio Bernardis.

Design and description
The Squalo-class submarines were essentially repeats of the preceding . They shared that design's problems with stability and seakeeping and required the same bulging of the hull to rectify the problems. They displaced  surfaced and  submerged. Their crew numbered 53 officers and enlisted men.

For surface running, the boats were powered by two  diesel engines, each driving one propeller shaft. When submerged each propeller was driven by a  electric motor. They could reach  on the surface and  underwater.

The boats were armed with eight internal  torpedo tubes, four each in the bow and stern. They carried a total of a dozen torpedoes. They were also armed with one  deck gun for combat on the surface. Their anti-aircraft armament consisted of two  machine guns.

Ships
 , sank after a collision off Taranto, 23 March 1943.
 , withdrawn from service, 9 September 1943.

See also
Italian submarines of World War II

Notes

References

External links 
Sommergibile "DELFINO" (2°)
 Classe Squalo Marina Militare website

Submarine classes
 Squalo
Ships built by Cantieri Riuniti dell'Adriatico
Submarines of the Regia Marina